The Northern Central Railway of York  is a non-profit, Civil War themed heritage railroad based in New Freedom, Pennsylvania. A reproduction 4-4-0 steam locomotive hauls passengers over 10 miles of Northern Central Railway track between New Freedom and Hanover Junction, Pennsylvania. The operation was originally named Steam into History and held its grand opening on June 1, 2013.  In 2019 it took up the historical name Northern Central Railway.

Historical significance of the Northern Central Railway
The historic Northern Central Railway was a vital transportation artery during the American Civil War. The line ran between Harrisburg, Pennsylvania and Baltimore, Maryland providing a direct north–south route in which federal troops and supplies were shuttled to the southernmost reaches of Union territory. The railroad's strategic importance was understood by the Confederates and as such it was targeted by rebel troops during Robert E. Lee’s Invasion of the North in June 1863. Railroad bridges, rolling stock, and telegraph lines along the Northern Central right-of-way were ruthlessly destroyed by the advancing rebel army.

The railway was pressed into military service shortly after the Battle of Gettysburg, transporting wounded troops to distant metropolitan hospitals in York, Baltimore, and Harrisburg. Several months later, President Abraham Lincoln and other dignitaries traveled over the line on their way to commemorate the Soldier’s National Cemetery at Gettysburg where Lincoln delivered his now famous address.

 The president and company boarded their private train in Baltimore and journeyed north over Northern Central tracks to Hanover Junction where they changed trains to continue West. The depot at Hanover Junction where Mr. Lincoln changed trains still stands today and is on the National Register of Historic Places. Much of the surrounding countryside has remained relatively unchanged since Lincoln’s historic journey.

Current operations
The Nortern Central Railway of York operates a -hour round trip excursion from New Freedom to Hanover Junction, where a brief layover provides an opportunity to explore the museum at Hanover Junction Depot. The railroad also operates a shorter, one-hour round trip excursion from New Freedom to Glen Rock.

The trains feature 4-4-0 steam locomotive York, a faithful reproduction of a typical American Standard engine common on North American railroads in the mid to late 19th century. York was custom built by the Kloke Locomotive Works in 2010–2013. Its design was based on O’Connor Engineering blueprints for the replica Union Pacific No. 119 and Central Pacific "Jupiter" locomotives (both engines currently reside at the Golden Spike National Historic Site in Utah). Kloke also built the Leviathan locomotive, which now operates in Elizabethtown, Pennsylvania.

The Northern Central train typically consists of three passenger coaches, one of which is converted to an open air car through the summer and fall. During each excursion, interpreters in period wardrobe offer historical commentary for passengers. Their narration provides insight into the importance of the railroad and its neighboring communities during the Civil War years and thereafter.

Special events planned for train rides throughout the year, such as musical entertainers and character reenactments, help support and complement the historical atmosphere of the railroad.

Equipment

Locomotive roster

Current rolling stock roster
 Coach 150, owned by SIH. 
 Combine 840, owned by SIH. 
 "Four Seasons Car" 127, owned by SIH. Designed for conversion between coach and open car.
 Flat Car, no reported number. Possible conversion to open air car in near future, owned by SIH.

Past rolling stock
 No. 10, 1946 GE 44 Ton Locomotive, leased from the Stewartstown Railroad.
 Coach 702, loaned from the Tavares, Eustis & Gulf Railroad. 
 Coach 213, loaned from the Tavares, Eustis & Gulf Railroad.
 Open Air Car 101, loaned from the Tavares, Eustis & Gulf Railroad.
Both 702 and 213 served as the main passenger consist from June 1 to September 29, 2013 while SIH's coach and combine were constructed by the Reader Railroad.

See also

List of heritage railroads in the United States
List of Pennsylvania railroads
Northern Central Railway
Hanover Junction, Hanover and Gettysburg Railroad

References

External links
Northern Central Railway of York

Railroad museums in Pennsylvania
Tourist attractions in York County, Pennsylvania
Heritage railroads in Pennsylvania
Transportation in York County, Pennsylvania
2013 establishments in Pennsylvania